The Cassidinae (tortoise and leaf-mining beetles) are a subfamily of the leaf beetles, or Chrysomelidae. The antennae arise close to each other and some members have the pronotal and elytral edges extended to the side and covering the legs so as to give them the common name of tortoise beetles. Some members, such as in the tribe Hispini, are notable for the spiny outgrowths to the pronotum and elytra.

Description
The "cassidoids" have a rounded outline with the edges of the pronotum and elytra expanded, spreading out to cover the legs and head. They are often colourful and metallic, with ornate sculpturing; a few species have the ability to change the colour due to water movements within the translucent cuticle. All members of the subfamily have the mouthparts reduced into a cavity in the head capsule, the legs have four segmented tarsi. The hispoids have larvae that are leaf miners, while the cassidoids feed on the plant surfaces, sometimes covering their bodies with faecal shields. Although fecal shields are thought to provide defense, no evidence exists for such a role.

A few species in two closely related tribes (Mesomphaliini and Eugenysini, putative sister taxa) show maternal care of larvae. These species can be viewed as subsocial or parasocial, with evidence pointing to there being two evolutionary origins of subsociality within this one lineage.

Taxonomy
It includes both the former subfamily "Hispinae" (leaf-mining beetles), as well as the former more narrowly defined subfamily Cassidinae (familiar as tortoise beetles) which are now split into several tribes that include the tribe Cassidini, and in all include over 125 genera. The traditional separation of the two groups was based essentially on the habitats of the larvae and the general shapes of the adults. The name Cassidinae for the merged subfamily is considered to have priority.

The former grouping of "Hispinae" (sometimes called leaf-mining beetles, or "hispoids") included the tribes Alurnini, Anisoderini, Aproidini, Arescini, Bothryonopini, Callispini, Callohispini, Cephaloleiini, Chalepini, Coelaenomenoderini, Cryptonychini, Cubispini, Eurispini, Exothispini, Gonophorini, Hispini, Hispoleptini, Hybosispini, Leptispini, Oediopalpini, Oncocephalini, Promecothecini, Prosopodontini, Sceloenoplini and Spilophorini. Most members of these tribes are elongated, slightly flattened beetles with parallel margins, and antennal bases close together on their small heads. They often have punctate elytra and pronotum, sometimes with spines both on and along the edges. The former grouping of Cassidinae (sometimes called tortoise beetles, or "cassidoids") included the tribes Aspidimorphini, Basiprionotini, Cassidini, Delocraniini, Dorynotini, Eugenysini, Goniocheniini, Hemisphaerotini, Mesomphaliini, Notosacanthini, Omocerini and Physonotini.

The subfamily names Cassidinae and Hispinae are both founded by Gyllenhal in the same 1813 book, but following the Principle of the First Reviser, Chen in this case,  priority is given to the name Cassidinae.

See also
 List of Cassidinae genera

References

External links
 Hispines of the world
 Photo atlas and interactive key to world Cassidinae

 
Polyphaga subfamilies
Articles containing video clips
Taxa named by Leonard Gyllenhaal